The politics of Hesse takes place within a framework of a federal parliamentary representative democratic republic, where the Federal Government of Germany exercises sovereign rights with certain powers reserved to the states of Germany including Hesse. The state has a multi-party system where, as in most other states of former Western Germany and the federal level, the two main parties are the centre-right Christian Democratic Union (CDU) and the centre-left Social Democratic Party of Germany (SPD).

Governments

The governments and ministers-President (Ministerpräsidenten) of the People's State of Hesse during the time of the Weimar Republic were:
 1919–1928: Center-right government, an SPD–DDP–Zentrum coalition led by Carl Ulrich (SPD) as minister-president
 1928–1933: Center-right government, an SPD–DDP–Zentrum coalition led by Bernhard Adelung (SPD) as minister-president

The governments of the National Socialist era:
 1933: National Socialist government with Ferdinand Werner (NSDAP) and minister-president
 1933–1935: National Socialist government with Philipp Wilhelm Jung (NSDAP) as minister-president
 1935–1945: National Socialist government with Jakob Sprenger (NSDAP) as minister-president

The governments and minister-Presidents of Hesse since the establishment of the Federal Republic of Germany:
 1945: Military occupation provisional government led by Ludwig Bergsträsser(SPD), appointed by the U.S. Military
 1945–1946: Military occupation provisional government led by Karl Geiler (no party), appointed by the U.S. military
 1946–1950: Theoretically a CDU–SPD grand coalition with Christian Stock (SPD) as minister-president, though U.S. Military Occupation remained through 1949.
 1950–1969: First truly non-military government of the Federal Republic, led by Georg-August Zinn (SPD), whose SPD ruled in coalition with the All-German Bloc/League of Expellees and Deprived of Rights, a party of expelled eastern Germans whose political goal was to retrieve their homelands (heimatlaender); and also with the League of Expellees' successors party the Gesamtdeutsche Partei.
 1969–1976: Center-left government of the SPD-FDP, with Albert Osswald (SPD) as minister-president
 1976–1982: Center-left government of the SPD-FDP continued with Holger Börner (SPD) as minister-president.
 1982–1984: Center-left government of the SPD (single party rule) with Holger Börner (SPD) as minister-president.
 1984–1987: Center-left government of the SPD–Greens with Holger Börner (SPD) as minister-president.
 1987–1991: Center-right government of the CDU–FDP with Walter Wallmann (CDU) as minister-president.
 1991–1999: Center-left government of the SPD–Greens with Hans Eichel (SPD) as minister-president.
 1999–2003: Center-right government of the CDU–FDP with Roland Koch (CDU) as minister-president.
 2003–2009: Center-right government of the CDU (single party rule) with Roland Koch (CDU) as minister-president.
 2009–2010: Center-right government of the CDU-FDP with Roland Koch (CDU) as minister-president.
 2010–present: Center-right government of the CDU–FDP with Volker Bouffier (CDU) as minister-president.

Since 1950, the SPD has been in the Hesse government 45 years, the CDU for 14 years; the FDP acted as coalition partners with either CDU or SPD for 21 years (13 with SPD, 8 with CDU).

Elections

The Hesse state election of 2008 for the state government (Landtag of Hesse) saw CDU support collapse, and it was widely assumed that the CDU would not participate in the new government. While outgoing CDU minister-president Roland Koch did lose his majority, the opposing parties were unable to form a coalition. The Greens and FDP rejected jointly sharing power with the CDU or SPD. This meant that the SPD and Greens needed to reach out to the new far-left Left party bloc of Landtag members, something very unpopular with most SPD members.

After two unsuccessful attempts to form a coalition from SPD and Greens with support from The Left, all parties except the SPD agreed to dissolve the parliament and call for early elections in January 2009. These were held, and popular anger at the bungling of the SPD delivered enough seats to form a new CDU-FDP coalition.

See also
 History of Hesse
 Landtag of Hesse
 Rulers of Hesse – the hereditary rulers of the Grand Duchy of Hesse prior to 1919